Robert Joseph McDougal (March 19, 1921August 10, 2003) was a professional American football fullback in the National Football League who played for the Green Bay Packers.  He was a native of Oconto, Wisconsin. McDougal played collegiate ball for Duke University and the University of Miami before being drafted by the Packers in the 9th round of the 1947 NFL Draft.  He played professionally in the NFL for 1 season, in 1947.

References

1921 births
2003 deaths
People from Oconto, Wisconsin
Players of American football from Wisconsin
American football fullbacks
Duke Blue Devils football players
Miami Hurricanes football players
Green Bay Packers players